Over its history Great Lakes Airlines was known to have flown to 164 airports in 162 cities, Chicago having been served through three airports. Most of its destinations were served as United Express, a code-share affiliate for United Airlines, through the 1990s until 2002. A second code-share operation with Midway Airlines known as Midway Connection was flown in the mid-1990s. From 2002 all flights were flown under the carrier's own brand. Great Lakes Airlines was also the largest Essential Air Service (EAS) provider in the United States for many years but only served two of its cities through the EAS program prior to ceasing operations. At the time of its shutdown on March 26, 2018, Great Lakes Airlines flew to the following domestic scheduled destinations:

Arizona
Prescott (Ernest A. Love Field)
Page Municipal Airport
Phoenix Sky Harbor International Airport Hub
California
Los Angeles International Airport Hub
Colorado
Denver International Airport Hub
Telluride Regional Airport
Wyoming
Cheyenne Regional Airport

Terminated destinations before closure 
Arizona
Kingman Airport
Show Low Regional Airport
Sierra Vista Municipal Airport
Tucson International Airport Former hub
California
LA/Ontario International Airport Former hub
Merced Regional Airport
Orange County (John Wayne Airport) 
Visalia Municipal Airport
Colorado
Alamosa (San Luis Valley Regional Airport)
Cortez Municipal Airport
Grand Junction Regional Airport
Gunnison-Crested Butte Regional Airport
Lamar Municipal Airport 
Steamboat Springs/Hayden-Yampa Valley Airport  
Indiana
Bloomington (Monroe County Airport)
Lafayette (Purdue University Airport)
Muncie (Delaware County Airport)
Terre Haute International Airport (Hulman Field)
Illinois
Carbondale (Southern Illinois Airport)
Chicago (O'Hare International Airport) Former hub
Chicago (Merrill C. Meigs Field)
Chicago (Midway International Airport)
Danville (Vermilion Regional Airport)
Decatur Airport
Galesburg Municipal Airport
Marion (Williamson County Regional Airport)
Mattoon (Coles County Memorial Airport)
Mount Vernon Airport 
Quincy Regional Airport
Sterling/Rock Falls (Whiteside County Airport) 
Springfield (Abraham Lincoln Capital Airport)
Iowa  
Burlington (Southeast Iowa Regional Airport)
Clinton Municipal Airport
Des Moines International Airport
Dubuque Regional Airport 
Fort Dodge Regional Airport
Mason City Municipal Airport
Ottumwa Regional Airport
Sioux City (Sioux Gateway Airport)  
Spencer Municipal Airport
Waterloo Regional Airport
Kansas
Dodge City Regional Airport
Garden City Regional Airport
Great Bend Municipal Airport
Goodland Municipal Airport
Hays Regional Airport
Liberal Mid-America Regional Airport
Manhattan Regional Airport
Salina Regional Airport
Wichita Mid-Continent Airport
Michigan
Alpena County Regional Airport
Detroit (Detroit Metropolitan Wayne County Airport) Former Hub
Escanaba (Delta County Airport)
Hancock/Houghton (Houghton County Memorial Airport)
Iron Mountain (Ford Airport)
Ironwood (Gogebic–Iron County Airport)
Lansing (Capitol Region International Airport)
Manistee County Blacker Airport
Marquette (Sawyer International Airport)
Menominee/Marinette (Twin County Airport)
Muskegon County Airport
Pellston Regional Airport
Sault Ste. Marie (Chippewa County International Airport)
Traverse City (Cherry Capital Airport)
Minnesota
Bemidji Regional Airport
Duluth International Airport
Fairmont Municipal Airport
Fergus Falls Municipal Airport
Mankato Regional Airport
Minneapolis–Saint Paul International Airport Former hub
Thief River Falls Regional Airport
Worthington Municipal Airport
Missouri
Cape Girardeau Regional Airport
Fort Leonard Wood (Waynesville Regional Airport at Forney Field)  
Joplin Regional Airport
Kansas City International Airport Former hub
Lambert–St. Louis International Airport Former hub
Montana
Billings Logan International Airport Former hub
Glasgow Airport (U.S.)
Glendive, Montana (Dawson Community Airport)
Havre City–County Airport
Lewistown Municipal Airport
Miles City Airport
Sidney–Richland Municipal Airport
Wolf Point, Montana (L. M. Clayton Airport)
Nebraska
Alliance Municipal Airport
Chadron Municipal Airport
Grand Island (Central Nebraska Regional Airport)
Kearney Regional Airport
McCook Regional Airport
Norfolk Regional Airport
North Platte Regional Airport
Omaha (Eppley Airfield)
Scottsbluff (Western Nebraska Regional Airport)
New Mexico
Albuquerque International Sunport Former hub
Clovis Municipal Airport
Farmington (Four Corners Regional Airport)
Gallup Municipal Airport
Santa Fe Municipal Airport
Silver City (Grant County Airport)
Nevada
Ely Airport
Las Vegas (McCarran International Airport) Former hub
North Dakota
Bismarck Municipal Airport
Devils Lake Regional Airport
Dickinson Theodore Roosevelt Regional Airport
Fargo (Hector International Airport)
Grand Forks International Airport 
Jamestown Regional Airport
Minot International Airport
Williston (Sloulin Field International Airport)
Oklahoma
Enid Woodring Regional Airport
Ponca City Regional Airport
South Dakota
Aberdeen Regional Airport
Brookings Regional Airport
Huron Regional Airport
Mitchell Municipal Airport
Pierre Regional Airport
Rapid City Regional Airport
Sioux Falls Regional Airport
Watertown Regional Airport
Yankton (Chan Gurney Municipal Airport)
Texas
Amarillo (Rick Husband Amarillo International Airport)
Utah
Moab Canyonlands Field
Vernal Regional Airport
Wisconsin
Manitowoc County Airport
Milwaukee (General Mitchell International Airport) Former hub
Oshkosh (Wittman Regional Airport)
Sturgeon Bay (Door County Cherryland Airport) 
Rhinelander–Oneida County Airport
Wyoming
Casper–Natrona County International Airport
Cody (Yellowstone Regional Airport)
Gillette–Campbell County Airport
Laramie Regional Airport
Riverton Regional Airport
Rock Springs–Sweetwater County Airport
Sheridan County Airport
Worland Municipal Airport
Mexico
Ciudad Obregon International Airport
Guaymas (General José María Yáñez International Airport)
Hermosillo International Airport
Puerto Penasco International Airport
Routes served as Midway Connection 1995-1997:
Raleigh–Durham International Airport Former Hub to:
Asheville, NC
Baltimore, MD
Charleston, SC
Columbia, SC
Columbus, OH
Greenville, SC/Spartanburg, SC
Harrisburg, PA
Hilton Head, SC
Jacksonville, FL
Myrtle Beach, SC
Norfolk, VA
Richmond, VA
Savannah, GA
Wilmington, NC

Notes 

Lists of airline destinations
Great Lakes Airlines